Paulina Guba (born 14 May 1991) is a Polish athlete specialising in the shot put. She won the silver medal at the 2015 Summer Universiade. She also represented her country at the 2015 World Championships finishing eleventh. She has achieved title Woman Shot Put European Champion 2018 from Athletics Championships played in Berlin. She also won the gold medal at Seaman third class (OR-1, pl:Marynarz) at the World Military Competition 2019 in China, what has contributed that Poland took 5th place Nations of the World.

Her personal bests in the event are 19.38 metres outdoors (Cetniewo 2018) and 18.77 metres indoors (Toruń 2018).

Competition record

References

1991 births
Living people
Polish female shot putters
World Athletics Championships athletes for Poland
People from Otwock
Athletes (track and field) at the 2016 Summer Olympics
Olympic athletes of Poland
Universiade medalists in athletics (track and field)
Universiade silver medalists for Poland
Universiade bronze medalists for Poland
Polish Athletics Championships winners
European Athletics Championships winners
Medalists at the 2015 Summer Universiade
Medalists at the 2017 Summer Universiade
Athletes (track and field) at the 2020 Summer Olympics